Norawit Titicharoenrak (born 13 June 2004), known by his nickname Gemini, is a Thai actor under GMMTV. Gemini started his career when he joined in the reality TV show "Thailand School Star" back in 2019. After being one of the finalists, he then signed an exclusive contract with GMMTV. He then made his acting debut when he made a quick appearance in the Bad Buddy The Series back in 2021. In 2022, he gained popularity when he played Tinn, one of the lead roles in the Thai comedy series, My School President.

Career 
At the age of fifteen, Gemini joined GMMTV's reality TV show, "Thailand School Star 2019" where he finished as one of the finalists, he then signed an exclusive contract with GMMTV. In 2021, Norawit made his television debut when he made a quick appearance in Bad Buddy The Series where he played as one of Nanon Korapat and Ohm Pawat's highschool junior. On December 2, 2022, the BL series My School President started airing in GMM25, in where he played as Tinn, the love interest of Gun played by Fourth Nattawat Jirochtikul. He will also have supporting role in the Midnight Series: Moonlight Chicken.

During GMMTV's recent event "GMMTV 2023: Diversely Yours", it was announced that Gemini will have a main role in the anthology Our Skyy 2. He will also have a supporting role in 23.5 degrees, a GL series played by Love Pattranite and Milk Pansa.

Early life and education 
Norawit was born in the city of Bangkok in Thailand on June 13, 2004, He was nicknamed Gemini after his zodiac sign. In May 2022, Gemini finished his secondary education at Harrow International School. He is now a Bachelor’s of Arts and Science in Integrated Innovation (BAScii) student at Chulalongkorn University.

Works

Filmography

Television

References

External links 
 
 Gemini Norawit on Instagram

Norawit Titicharoenrak
Norawit Titicharoenrak
Norawit Titicharoenrak
2004 births
Living people